Jaffna Kings, formerly known as Jaffna Stallions, are a franchise cricket team which plays in the Lanka Premier League (LPL). On December 16, 2020, the team won the inaugural Lanka Premier League 2020 Championship and are the current title holder of the tournament. The team captain Thisara Perera and Shoaib Malik both played pivotal roles in the win.

The team is coached by former Sri Lankan captain Thilina Kandamby. Thisara Perera is the team's captain.

Seasons

2020 season
The team was owned by a consortium consisting of Sri Lankans and Indians from all over the world including Australia, Canada, France, United Kingdom, and the USA. Arnold Anandan and Rahul Sood, creator of Microsoft Ventures M12, were leading the consortium of tech industry leaders from the Pacific Northwest and Silicon Valley. Among others, Rahul Sood was cited as a tech leader from the Seattle area who is investing in cricket, where the Jaffna Stallions also announced a global education partnership with Code.org. As part of their outreach to the country of Sri Lanka the Jaffna Stallions released a song in partnership with famous artists La Signore, aka Lahiru Perera, and Dinesh Gamage, the song contains lyrics in both Sinhalese and Tamil and it's now trending at the top of the charts in Sri Lanka.

2021 season
In July 2021, Sri Lanka Cricket (SLC) terminated the franchise ahead of the 2021 Lanka Premier League, due to financial issues. In September 2021, the team changed their name to Jaffna Kings after changing owners.

2022 season
In July 2022 , Sri Lanka Cricket (slc)

Sponsors

Current squad
 Players with international caps are listed in bold.
  denotes a player who is currently unavailable for selection.
  denotes a player who is unavailable for rest of the season.

Administration and support staff

Honours

League
Lanka Premier League
Champions (3): 2020, 2021,2022

Statistics

By season

 Last updated : 16 December 2022
 Source :ESPNcricinfo

By opposition

 Last updated: 8 January 2022
 Source : ESPNcricinfo

See also
 Jaffna Stallions in 2020
 Jaffna Kings in 2021
 Jaffna Kings in 2022

References

2020 establishments in Sri Lanka
Cricket clubs established in 2020
Lanka Premier League teams
Jaffna Kings
Lyca Productions